Joe Sostilio (January 3, 1915 – July 9, 2000) was a Hall of Fame auto racing driver from Natick, Massachusetts. He was born in Newton, Massachusetts, Sostilio was a prominent midget and stockcar driver.

In 1932, at the age of 17, Sostilio won the first race he ever entered, driving a Model A Ford.  By 1935, Sostilio had added a championship to his resume by capturing the New England Dirt Championship.  He repeated as champion in 1936 and 1938. He captured the 1939 Vermont State Midget Championship.

In 1941, Joe finished fourth in the first Midget race at the Williams Grove Speedway.

Joe interrupted his racing career to serve his country (1941–1944) during World War II.

When the war ended, Joe returned to the Midget ranks with the Bay State Midget Racing Association, losing the championship to Bob Blair by one point.  In 1946, he piloted the Koopman Offenhauser and finished 4th in BSMRA points, competing at tracks from Seekonk, Massachusetts to Akron, Ohio.  In 1947, Sostilio piloted the #54 Leader Card Offy to claim the Bay State Midget title on the strength of 31 wins, 23 seconds and 12 third-place finishes. Notable victories from that season include the first-ever race at Westboro Speedway near Worcester, Massachusetts and another win during the inaugural season of the Lonsdale Sports Arena in Rhode Island.

In 1948, Sostilio finished sixth in United Car Owners Association points, driving for the MacLeod Racing Team with fellow Hall of Famer, Johnny Thomson.

In 1949, Sostilio turned his focus to Stock Car racing, traveling from New England to South Bend, Indiana for three consecutive weeks and claiming the trophy each time.  In AAA competition, Sostilio won seven races between 1948 and 1950 at tracks all over the country: South Bend, Indiana, Milwaukee Mile, Akron, Ohio; Miami, Florida and Heidelberg, Pennsylvania.  Sostilio also became a frequent competitor in the California winter circuits during this time as well.

In the early 1950s Joe competed in the AAA Big Cars alongside his teammate, Indianapolis 500 winner Johnnie Parsons.  Joe beat fellow Hall of Famer Tommy Hinnershitz to win the 1953 AAA Eastern Sprint Car Championship.  That title run was bookended by efforts of 5th in 1952 and 6th in 1954.

His career-best finish on the AAA/Champ Car circuit was a pair of 7th-place efforts at Langhorne Speedway and Darlington Speedway in 1954.

Joe died on July 9, 2000 at the age of 85.

Awards
2003 saw Sostilio become a Hall of Fame member when he was inducted into two Halls-of-Fame, with the New England Auto Racers Hall of Fame and the National Midget Auto Racing Hall of Fame honoring his achievements. He was inducted in the National Sprint Car Hall of Fame in 2011. In 2021 Joe was honored at the New England Racing Museums Legends Day event.

References

External links
Biography at the New England Auto Racers Hall of Fame
Biography at the National Midget Auto Racing Hall of Fame

1915 births
2000 deaths
American military personnel of World War II
National Sprint Car Hall of Fame inductees
People from Natick, Massachusetts
Sportspeople from Newton, Massachusetts
Sportspeople from Middlesex County, Massachusetts
Racing drivers from Massachusetts
AAA Championship Car drivers